Billy Pettinger (born February 1, 1982) is a Canadian-born singer and songwriter who performs under the moniker Billy the Kid. She also fronts the rock band Billy and the Lost Boys and played drums in Vancouver's longest surviving Ramones cover band, the Ramores.

Pettinger has been the primary songwriter in all of her original projects and has collaborated with such artists as Garth Hudson from The Band and Bob Dylan, Frank Turner and Jamie Candiloro.

Her debut release The Lost Cause was produced and engineered by Raine Maida, lead singer of Canadian rock band Our Lady Peace. Billy the Kid released a fan-funded album with Jamie Candiloro (Ryan Adams/Willie Nelson) entitled "Stars, Exploding" in November 2012. In February 2013 she released "Perspective" where she played all instruments and acted as producer. 2014 saw the release of "Horseshoes & Hand Grenades" produced by Frank Turner and released on Xtra Mile Recordings.

Biography

Personal life
At 16 Pettinger put together her first band in which she was the lead singer and guitarist. The Blue Collar Bullets featured You Say Party drummer Devon Clifford who died on stage in 2010.

Billy and the Lost Boys
After The Blue Collar Bullets, Pettinger put together a lineup of musicians and within twelve days of forming, Billy and the Lost Boys played their first concert.  They would go on to release 3 albums, 2 music videos and in May 2004 reached #1 on the Canadian College and Campus Radio Charts. Their music was featured in television shows Radio Free Roscoe, Degrassi: The Next Generation and The Collector. She self-engineered and produced the 4th Billy and the Lost Boys album titled "Off The Map".

Solo work
Pettinger released a five-song EP called The Lost Cause on November 14, 2008. The EP contains the songs "These City Lights", "Drown", "The Drugs", "I Don't Want to Know" and "Just Trying to Get By". The Lost Cause was produced by Our Lady Peace front man Raine Maida. It is sold on her website, and on iTunes. An additional six songs were recorded at the same time, some of which were re-recorded for the album "Ours" (the remainder were released on 2011's "Demo-Lish"). In 2010 Billy the Kid began a crowd sourcing campaign to fund her debut full-length album. In addition to pre-orders and specialized bundles, she traveled across the continent to play fundraisers, anniversaries, birthday parties and private concerts as well as go camping, white water rafting and rock climbing with fans. The result was the appropriately titled album "Ours". Pettinger's songs have appeared in A&E's Biography, Miami Ink, America's Got Talent, American Idol, My 600 LB Life, Larry Crowne starring Tom Hanks and Foreverland featuring Juliette Lewis. She has toured/performed with Against Me!, Dropkick Murphys, Billy Bragg, Chuck Ragan, Tim Barry, Dave Hause, Mikey Erg, The Weakerthans, Face to Face and Laura Jane Grace.

Discography

Billy Pettinger
2016: Pick Up Your Tiny Burden
2016: You Can Have It All
2016: I Have to Do This
2019: Look At Me, I'm Fine
2021: There Is Only Right Now

Billy the Kid
2008: The Lost Cause
2010: Live at the Verge
2011: Demo-Lish
2011: Ours – Acoustic
2012: Stars, Exploding
2013: Perspective
2014: Horseshoes & Hand Grenades

Billy the Kid & The Southside Boys
2011: OursBilly the Kid and the Lost Boys
2002: Strong Like Prawn2004: Breaking Down the Barriers That Break Down Your Music2005: Breaking Down the Barriers That Break Down Your Music Remastered2006: Yet Why Not Say What Happened?2008: Off The Map''

References and notes

External links 

 
Billy the Kid's official facebook profile

1982 births
Living people
Canadian women rock singers
Canadian songwriters
Musicians from Vancouver
Canadian rock guitarists
Writers from Vancouver
21st-century Canadian women singers
21st-century Canadian guitarists
21st-century women guitarists